Natalie Charlesworth is an Australian judge, sitting on the Federal Court of Australia.

Early life and education

Charlesworth was born and raised in Port Augusta, South Australia. Charlesworth moved to Adelaide to study at the University of South Australia earning her Bachelor of Arts degree in journalism in 1991. She spent a decade working as a journalist.  Charlesworth then earned a Bachelor of Laws degree from Australian National University (ANU) in Canberra. Charlesworth also holds a Graduate Diploma in Legal Practice from ANU.

Career
Charlesworth started her career as an associate to the Hon. Justice John Mansfield   of the Federal Court. She then worked for the South Australian Crown Solicitor's Office, as solicitor, and later senior solicitor. She became a senior associate with Kelly & Co Lawyers. Charlesworth became a barrister in 2007 and was listed by Doyle's Guide as a leading employment law barrister in Adelaide in 2015, and 2016.

On 25 February 2016, George Brandis, the Attorney-General of Australia, announced Charlesworth's appointment to the Federal Court of Australia, effective 1 March 2016. Charlesworth was appointed to the Adelaide registry, replacing the retiring Justice Mansfield.

Federal Court rulings
In December 2016, Charlesworth ruled in favour of a French wine company Pernod Ricard, finding the company did not infringe upon Australian winery Yalumba's trademark.

Charlesworth presided over Radio Adelaide's lawsuit against ABC over ABC's attempt to re-brand one of its stations in November 2017. Charlesworth granted an injunction in favour of Radio Adelaide. 

In 2019, 2021 and 2022 Charlesworth presided over several native title cases, granting title rights to the Nukunu and Barngarla peoples of the western Flinders Ranges area of South Australia. The border between the two groups of area around Port Augusta, which had been disputed for around 28 years, was settled by these decisions.

Personal life
Charlesworth is the mother of three children.

See also
List of judges of the Federal Court of Australia

References

Judges of the Federal Court of Australia
Living people
Australian women judges
21st-century Australian judges
University of South Australia alumni
Australian National University alumni
Year of birth missing (living people)
Judges of the Supreme Court of the Australian Capital Territory
21st-century women judges
People from Port Augusta